SOS-Hermann Gmeiner International College (locally called HGIC) is a school in Tema, Ghana. It is a selective preparatory college that educates students from across Africa as well as from America, Europe, and Asia. 

With a Pan-African mission and philosophy, the school prepares young leaders who go on to top universities around the globe; with recent alumni going on to Yale, Harvard, Dartmouth, Stanford, MIT, University of Edinburgh, University of British Columbia, and the University of Cape Town. 

The school was established in 1990 as a project of SOS Kinderdorf to educate the most academically promising students growing up in SOS-Children's Villages across the continent of Africa These countries include: Zimbabwe, Zambia, Kenya, Tanzania, Rwanda, Burundi, Uganda, Swaziland, Lesotho, Nigeria and Sierra Leone. Alongside the students from the SOS Children's Villages, the school also educates top students who apply from Ghana, and neighboring countries. In total, the school has about 360 students representing 24 nationalities with nearly 40% of students coming from the SOS Children's Villages. It is also considered one of the best schools in Ghana when it comes to the senior high school level.

Curriculum 
The school previously offered two curriculum. The IGCSE in the first two years and the International Baccalaureate diploma or certificate in the latter two years. The school is currently established as a full IB school and therefore, offers the IB curriculum for all four years.

Campus and facilities 
SOS-HGIC has two campuses. The academic campus consists of classrooms, a library, computer labs, science labs, administrative offices, auditorium, dining area, and performing and visual arts spaces. The residential campus, referred to as the hostels, consists of student residence halls, a central dining hall, track, soccer field, tennis courts, outdoor swimming pool and gym. Both campuses are fully wireless and have provide 24-hour security. Students typically walk between the two campuses, though shuttle service is available during inclement weather or late-night events.

Schools in Ghana
International Baccalaureate schools in Ghana
Educational institutions established in 1990
1990 establishments in Ghana